Wayne Leonard Russell (born 29 November 1967) was a Welsh football player during the 1990s and early 2000s.

Honours
 League of Ireland: 1
 Bohemians - 2000/01
Irish Football League Premier Division: 1
 Glentoran - 1998/99
 FAI Cup: 1
 Bohemians - 2001
Irish Cup: 1
 Glentoran - 1998

References

External links
Welsh Premier profile

1967 births
Living people
Welsh footballers
Bohemian F.C. players
Waterford F.C. players
Derry City F.C. players
Burnley F.C. players
Glentoran F.C. players
Cymru Premier players
English Football League players
NIFL Premiership players
League of Ireland players
Association football goalkeepers